Catalunya Sí que es Pot (also translated as "Catalonia It Is Possible" or "Yes, Catalonia Can") was a left-wing coalition composed of Podemos, Initiative for Catalonia Greens (ICV) and United and Alternative Left (EUiA). It was formed in 2015 to stand in the Catalan election scheduled for 27 September that year.

CSQP secured 367,613 votes (8.94% of the vote) and 11 seats in the 2015 Catalan election.

Composition

Electoral performance

Parliament of Catalonia

Notes

References

2015 establishments in Catalonia
2017 disestablishments in Catalonia
Defunct political party alliances in Spain
Podemos (Spanish political party)
Political parties in Catalonia
Political parties established in 2015
Political parties disestablished in 2017